Kép is a township (Thị trấn) of Lạng Giang District, Bắc Giang Province, in north-eastern Vietnam.
It is the location of the Kép Railway Station.

References

Populated places in Bắc Giang province
Communes of Bắc Giang province
Townships in Vietnam